The Palawan hornbill (Anthracoceros marchei) is a large forest bird endemic to the Philippines.  It is one of the 11 endemic hornbills in the country. It is only found in Palawan and nearby islands of Balabac, Busuanga, Calauit, Culion and Coron.  It is locally known as 'talusi' in the language Cuyunon, It is threatened by habitat loss, hunting and trapping for the cage-bird trade.

Description and Behavior 
Its plumage is entirely black except for a white tail and a long, thick, pale cream-colored bill and casque. Whitish bare skin around the eyes and across the throat is tinged blue. Female has a smaller bill and casque. Unmistakable. The only hornbill in its range. Voice is a raucous cackling which can be transcribed as kaaww and kreik-kreik."

They exhibit sexual dimorphism in which males have more prominent casques and bills and an overall larger size than females.

Among the Philippine hornbills, it is most closely related to the Sulu hornbill but is differentiated by its white bill and face versus the Sulu hornbill's jet black features.

The Palawan hornbill consumes mostly fruit, but also occasional insects and vertebrates. Due to its large size and home range, it is an important vector of seed dispersal for large-seeded trees. Many ground-dwelling seed-eating mammals live beneath such trees, and in areas where hornbills have become rare, 
consume such a large percentage of the fallen seeds that they threaten the trees' survival.

It is usually seen in pairs or small noisy family groups, and it has a communal roosting site. It is most usually observed in fruiting trees at the forest edge, but also feeds on insects and small reptiles.

Habitat and Conservation Status 
It inhabits primary and secondary dipterocarp forest, mangrove swamps and forest edge up to 900 meters above sea level. It has also occasionally been recorded visiting farmland and cultivations.  It requires large trees for nesting. While they can tolerate secondary forest, they have the highest population densities and health in primary (old-growth) forest

It is officially classified as vulnerable with the population estimated at 2,500 to 9,999 mature individuals remaining with its numbers have reduced by at least 20% in the last 10 years due to habitat destruction, hunting for food, and the live bird trade. It is threatened by habitat destruction through logging.  conversion into agricultural land or urban development an mining.

Most visiting birdwatchers travel to St Paul's National Park, Palawan, to see this bird, but it is now uncommon. It acts as a bio-indicator due to its sensitivity to environmental changes.

The species is present in conservation areas - the entirety of Palawan has been designated a biosphere reserve but actual protection and enforcement against logging and hunting has been difficult.  There are populations in several other protected areas such as Puerto Princesa Subterranean River National Park, El Nido Marine Reserve and others. It is listed in CITES as Appendix II.

Conservation actions proposed include surveys in remaining lowland forests throughout its range. Seek greater control of the cage-bird trade and assess its impacts. Research its ecological requirements and conduct nest protection schemes. Support the proposed extension of Puerto Princesa Subterranean River National Park and formally protect the forests at Iwahig Prison and Penal Farm. Carry out awareness campaigns regarding the protected status of the species. Allocate greater resources towards more effective control of hunting in Palawan forests and initiate conservation awareness campaigns amongst forest product collectors.

References

External links 
 BirdLife Species Factsheet
 Red Data Book
 Palawan Hornbill

Anthracoceros
Birds of Palawan
Endemic birds of the Philippines
Birds described in 1885